Wakefield City Academies Trust (WCAT) was a multi-academy trust (MAT) that managed 21 schools (14 primary and 7 secondary) across West Yorkshire, South Yorkshire, and the East Riding of Yorkshire. As an academy trust, it was an exempt charity regulated by the Department for Education (DfE).

In September 2017, WCAT announced it would cease operation and dissolve once new sponsor organisations have been found for its schools.

Schools

Primary
The trust operated 14 primary schools across South Yorkshire and West Yorkshire.

 Barkerend Academy, Bradford
 Bell Lane Academy, Pontefract
 Brookfield Primary Academy, Mexborough
 Carr Lodge Academy, Doncaster
 Havercroft Academy, Wakefield
 Heathview Academy, Wakefield
 High Crags Academy, Shipley
 Kinsley Academy, Pontefract
 Montagu Academy, Mexborough
 Morley Place Academy, Doncaster
 Thornbury Academy, Bradford
 Waverley Academy, Doncaster
 West End Academy, Pontefract
 Willow Academy, Doncaster

Secondary
The trust operated seven secondary schools across East Yorkshire, South Yorkshire and West Yorkshire.
 Balby Carr Community Academy, Doncaster
 The Freeston Academy, Normanton
 Goole High School, Goole
 Hemsworth Arts and Community Academy, Pontefract
 Mexborough Academy, Mexborough
 Wakefield City Academy, Wakefield
 Yewlands Academy, Sheffield

Create Studio, a 14–19 studio school in Goole, was managed by WCAT prior to its closure in August 2015.

History
Wakefield City Academies Trust was founded in late 2010, with its first school, Wakefield City Academy, joining the trust in January 2011.

Alan Yellup, CEO of the trust, was awarded an OBE for services to Education in the Queen's 2014 Birthday Honours.

In July 2015 WCAT became the third academy trust to receive a focused inspection by Ofsted. The trust was praised, with the report finding it to be "making a positive difference" to pupils.

In November 2015, WCAT was one of 5 "top performing" academy trusts to receive a share of £5m government grant funding to improve schools in the north of England.

During autumn 2016 the trust was criticised for its financial practices. In October it was reported the trust had made payments of £440,000 to companies owned by its interim CEO, Mike Ramsey and his daughter. In November, a report by the DfE's Education Funding Agency of findings from an investigation into WCAT was leaked. It revealed "extreme concern" in response to Ramsey being paid £82,000 for 15 weeks' work, and in total found 16 breaches of official guidance.

Request to stop operating
In September 2017, the Wakefield City Academies Trust requested to stop operating all of its 21 schools, because it could not make the "rapid improvement our academies need and our students deserve". Five of its schools had been rated inadequate by Ofsted. The Department for Education agreed to the transfer of all WCAT schools to new sponsor organisations, with the trust continuing to operate during the "re-brokering" process. The announcement prompted a call from local MP Yvette Cooper for a review of accountability in multi-academy trusts, and public petition that the schools be returned to local authority control.

In October 2017, records were released indicating that plans to transfer schools away from WCAT had existed since December 2016. At that time it was planned for the rebrokering of 10 schools to other academy trusts, leaving WCAT "with a viable, manageable and sustainable MAT".

The Department for Education announced details of which academy trusts were its "preferred sponsors" for the WCAT schools in October 2017, and began a period of consultation with interested parties.

Transfer of assets
In October 2017, Wakefield City Academies Trust stood accused of "asset stripping" when it was reported to have transferred funds away from the schools it managed, including hundreds of thousands of pounds raised for the schools by volunteers. Wakefield City Academy could lose up to £800,000 of its reserves. Hemsworth Arts and Community Academy, a mixed secondary school in Wakefield, could lose £436,000 of its reserves. Heath View primary school, Wakefield, could lose £300,000. High Crags Academy primary school in Shipley was put into special measures by Ofsted and instructed to join WCAT by the DfE in April 2016. They will lose their surplus of £178,000.

In December 2017, West Yorkshire Police confirmed they were looking at the conduct of WCAT after being passed information by Wakefield Council. The investigation came to an end in April 2018, the police concluding in a statement that "no crimes have been recorded."

New sponsors
The Department for Education confirmed the new sponsors for the majority of WCAT schools during January 2018, and the sponsor for Balby Carr Community Academy at the end of March 2018. After the consultation period, it was decided that Kinsley Academy and West End Academy, two primary schools previously earmarked for transfer Outwood Grange Academies Trust, would instead join Waterton Academy Trust, decisions that "reflect the views of parents and staff".

Mexborough Academy joined the DfE's preferred sponsor, Delta Academies Trust, in November 2018. The transfer had been delayed due to concern over high costs relating to the school's Private finance initiative contract.

Winding up
WCAT ended its 2018 financial year with a cash balance in excess of £2m. The trust said it expected to still have reserves when wound up and stated that any surplus would be used for the benefit of students. Its February 2019 accounts stated a cash balance of over £1m. In June 2019, WCAT confirmed it had returned an undisclosed sum to the Department for Education. Mary Creagh, MP for Wakefield, called for the funds to be returned to "the schools who were so badly affected by the trust's collapse".

In October 2019, WCAT entered into liquidation and ceased operation. The remaining funds were sufficient to cover outstanding liabilities, but not for any money to be returned to the trust's former schools.

References

External links
 
Letter announcing the closure of the trust 9 September 2017

Academy trusts
Educational institutions established in 2010
2010 establishments in England